The Kaisar-i-Hind Medal for Public Service in India was a medal awarded by the Emperor/Empress of India between 1900 and 1947, to "any person without distinction of race, occupation, position, or sex ... who shall have distinguished himself (or herself) by important and useful service in the advancement of the public interest in British Raj."

The name "Kaisar-i-Hind" ( qaisar-e-hind) literally means "Emperor of India" in the Hindustani language.  The word kaisar, meaning "emperor" is a derivative of the Roman imperial title Caesar, via Persian (see Qaysar-i Rum) from Greek Καίσαρ Kaísar, and is cognate with the German title Kaiser, which was borrowed from Latin at an earlier date. Based upon this, the title Kaisar-i-Hind was coined in 1876 by the orientalist G.W. Leitner as the official imperial title for the British monarch in India. The last ruler to bear it was George VI.

Kaisar-i-Hind was also inscribed on the obverse side of the India General Service Medal (1909), as well as on the Indian Meritorious Service Medal.

History
Empress of India or Kaisar-i-Hind, a term coined by the orientalist G.W. Leitner in a deliberate attempt to dissociate British imperial rule from that of preceding dynasties was taken by Queen Victoria from 1 May 1876, and proclaimed at the Delhi Durbar of 1877.

The medal was instituted by Queen Victoria on 10 April 1900. The name translates as "Emperor of India" (a name also used for a rare Indian butterfly, Teinopalpus imperialis). The Royal Warrant for the Kaisar-i-Hind was amended in 1901, 1912, 1933 and 1939. While never officially rescinded, the Kaisar-i-Hind ceased to be awarded following the passage of the Indian Independence Act 1947. The awards of the gold medal were often published in the London Gazette, while other classes were published in the Gazette of India.

Medal grades and design
The medal had three grades. The Kaisar-i-Hind Gold Medal for Public Service in India was awarded directly by the monarch on the recommendation of the Secretary of State for India. Silver and Bronze medals were awarded by the Viceroy. The medal consisted of an oval-shaped badge or decoration in gold, silver or bronze with the Royal Cipher and Monarchy on one side, and the words "Kaisar-i-Hind for Public Service in India" on the other. It was to be worn suspended from the left breast by a dark blue ribbon. The medal has no post-nominal initials.

Its most famous recipient is Mohandas Gandhi, who was awarded the Kaisar-i-Hind in 1915 by The Lord Hardinge of Penshurst for his contribution to ambulance services in South Africa. Gandhi returned the medal in 1920 as part of the national campaign protesting in the support of the Khilafat Movement.

Notable recipients
Gold medal
 Khan Saheb (1909) Bahadur (1917) Mirza Mohammed Baig philanthropist, Yemmiganur, A.P.
 Sardar Khan Bahadur Mir Abdul Ali, JP, Bombay, 9 November 1901
 Dr Margaret Ida Balfour, Scottish doctor and campaigner for women's medical health issues
 Dr Mary Ronald Bisset, Scottish physician and missionary for women's medical health.
Florence Mary Macnaghten, British - Scottish CMS nurse / in charge of the Canadian Zanana Mission Hospital at Kangra, Punjab, India, for 1905 earthquake relief work and for women's medical health.
 Richard Burn, for famine services in 1907–08
 Shankar Madhav Chitnavis, Esq., Deputy-Commissioner, Central Provinces, 9 November 1901
 Major General Thomas Arthur Cooke, for distinguished service in the advancement of the interests of the British Raj
 The Lady Curzon of Kedleston, for distinguished service in the advancement of the interests of the British Raj
 Major Herbert Edward Deane, R.A.M.C., 9 November 1901
 Major Thomas Edward Dyson, MB, CM, Indian Medical Service, 9 November 1901
 Mrs E J Firth, of Madras, awarded medal on 9 November 1901 for distinguished service in the advancement of the interests of the British Raj
 Mohandas Karamchand Gandhi (returned 1920)
 Major General Sir William Forbes Gatacre, chairman of the plague committee of Bombay City 1896 and 1897
 N S Glazebrook, Esq., JP, of Bombay, 9 November 1901
 Very Rev John A. Graham, D.D., for distinguished service in the advancement of the interests of the British Raj
 Thomas Holderness, for distinguished service in the advancement of the interests of the British Raj
 Sydney Hutton Cooper Hutchinson, Esq., AMICE, Superintendent of Telegraphs, 9 November 1901
 The Most Hon Alice Isaacs, Marchioness of Reading
 Reverend William Henry Jackson of the Blind School, Kemmendine, Rangoon, awarded the gold medal for public services in India, 1930.
 Colonel Sir Samuel Swinton Jacob, KCIE, Indian Staff Corps, 9 November 1901
 Hakim Ajmal Khan, physician and one of the founders of the Jamia Millia Islamia University
Isabel Kerr, Scottish medical missionary in India in the early 20th-century, created the Victoria Leprosy Centre in Hyderabad, and worked to cure leprosy across India.
 Taw Sein Ko, for distinguished service in the advancement of the interests of the British Raj
 Harrington Verney Lovett, Esq., Indian Civil Service, 9 November 1901
 Elizabeth Adelaide Manning, awarded the medal in 1904 for distinguished service in the advancement of the interests of the British Raj
 Sir Francis William Maclean, for distinguished service in the advancement of the interests of the British Raj
 Herbert Frederick Mayes, Esq., Barrister-at-Law, Indian Civil Service, 9 Nov 1901
 Lieutenant-Colonel James McCloghry, FRCS, Indian Medical Service, 9 November 1901
 Miss Eleanor McDougall, awarded Medal of the First Class in June 1923 for her work as Principal of the Women's Christian College, Madras
 A Donald Miller, MBE, (1939) for work with the Leprosy Mission 1921-1942
 Rev Charles Henry Monahan, awarded Medal of the First Class in February 1937 for his work as General Superintendent, Methodist Missionary Society, Madras
 Olive Monahan, Gold Medal with Bar, retired Chief Medical Officer Kalyani Hospital, Madras
Sarojini Naidu, Received gold medal for organising flood relief work in Hyderabad, later returned in protest over Jallianwala Bagh massacre.
Amina Hydari - social worker, reformer, activist. Received medal for organising flood relief work in Hyderabad during the Musi floods.
 Vidyagauri Nilkanth, social reformer, educationist, and writer
 William Florey Noyce, Esq., Extra-Assistant Commissioner and Assistant Secretary to the Financial Commissioner, Burma, 9 November 1901
 Dr John David O′Donnell, MBE, VD, FRCSEd, Chief Medical and Sanitary Officer, Kolar Gold Fields, Mysore, July 1926
 Babu Sri Ram, Rai Bahadur, for distinguished service in the advancement of the interests of the British Raj
 V. P. Madhava Rao, CIE
 Mary Reed (missionary), 1917, for missionary services to lepers
 Thomas d'Esterre Roberts, S.J., Archbishop of Bombay, for services to the forces during World War II
 HH Madho Rao Scindia, Maharaja Scindia of Gwalior
 Lieutenant-Colonel Sir David Semple, for distinguished service in the advancement of the interests of the British Raj
 Rai Bahadur Kameleshwari Pershad Singh of Monghyr, Bengal
 HH Ganga Singh, Maharaja of Bikaner
 Maharaja Rameshwar Singh Bahadur of Darbhanga
 Donald Mackenzie Smeaton CSI, Scottish Liberal MP and Indian civil servant
 Cornelia Sorabji, Gold Medal with Bar, first female advocate in India, first woman to practice law in India and Britain
 Robert Barton Stewart, Esq., Indian Civil Service, 9 November 1901
 Dr William Stokes, for distinguished service in the advancement of the interests of the British Raj
 Rev Dr Frederick Vincent Thomas, Baptist Medical Mission, Palwal
 Edgar Thurston, for distinguished service in the advancement of the interests of the British Raj
 Gajadhar Upadhaya, Esq., Chief Regimental Religious Teacher, 1st (K.G.V.s Own) G.R. [Gurkha Rifles]
 Raja Ravi Verma, for distinguished service in the advancement of the interests of the British Raj
 Captain Edmund Wilkinson, FRCS, Indian Medical Service, 9 November 1901
 HH Rajagopala Krishna Yachendra, Maharaja of Venkatagiri.
 Arthur Delaval Younghusband, civil servant, awarded for distinguished service in the advancement of the interests of the British Raj
 Lieutenant Colonel Sir Francis Edward Younghusband, British Army officer, explorer, and spiritual writer
 Maganbhai Bavajibhai Patel "Bavaji Nivas" Ode
Sir Kashirao Holkar (Dada Saheb) KCSI KIH
Dr Jean Murray Orkney, Chief Medical Officer, Women's Medical Service
Jane Leeke Latham, missionary head in 1938.
Dr Mohammod Sharif for exceptional services in earthquake affected areas more noticeably in Quetta, Pakistan. Awarded the medal in 1930s 
Dhanvanthi Rama Rau for her work with women’s associations.

Silver medal

 AMIR SARDAR SHAH, 1919, for distinguished service in the advancement medical field, being a doctor in the British Raj
 Kheroth Bose, medical missionary, for bringing medical care to rural India.
 Sita Devi Sahiba, Maharajkumarani of Kapurthala, New Year's Honours list 1944
 Alice Headwards-Hunter, surgeon, 1945
 Dr Mina MacKenzie, medical doctor for over 30 years of public service in India, including helping control the cholera epidemic during the 1906 Kumbh Mela pilgrimage
Dr Alexandrina Matilda MacPhail, medical missionary
 Alexander Steel, for services to cotton growing
 Helen Vorley, for her part in facilitating the evacuation of 300,000 Indians from Burma in 1942
 Sir William James Wanless, for distinguished service in the advancement of the interests of the British Raj
 Dr Lilian Arratoon, surgeon, March !945 For public service in India

Bronze medal
 Clara Anne Williams (née Rendall), 1946, for her work during WWII being in-charge of Red Cross Work in Dooars, Bengal.

Unknown grade

 Kaviraja Shyamaldas (1836-1893), one of the first modern Indian historian and author of Vir Vinod; Kaviraja and Dewan of Udaipur State

 Dr. Jitendera Kumar Mukherjee, Head surgeon of Leperacy Asylum in Nanni, Allahabad
 Frederick Booth-Tucker, Commissioner in the Salvation Army
 General Sir Charles John Burnett 
Liston Garthwaite (May, 1900) 
 Isabel Kerr (1923), medical missionary, for working with lepers
Florence Mary Macnaghten
 HH Sayajirao Gaekwad III, Maharaja of Baroda
 HH Bhagvatsingh, Maharaja of Gondal
 HH Tukojirao Holkar II, Maharaja of Indore
 HH Sultan Shah Jahan, Begum of Bhopal
 Khan Bahadur Raja Jahandad Khan
 Seth Jehangir Hormusji Kothari, merchant and philanthropist from Karachi (present-day Pakistan)
 HH Khengarji III, Maharao of Kutch
 Pandita Ramabai, for distinguished service in the advancement of the interests of the British Raj
 Edward Sell, missionary and Islamic scholar 
Udai Pratap Nath Shah Deo, Maharaja of Chotanagpur
 HH Pratap Singh, Maharaja of Idar
 HH Partab Singh, Maharaja of Kashmir
 HH Ram Singh, Maharaja of Bharatpur
 HH Nihal Singh, Rana of Dholpur
 Dr Howard Somervell, OBE, for distinguished service in the advancement of the interests of the British Raj
 Sir Robert Stanes, for distinguished service in the advancement of the interests of the British Raj
 Parukutty Nethyar Amma (Lady Rama Varma of Cochin) received the medal in 1919 for public work.
 Sister R. S. Subbalakshmi, educationist and social worker, Madras, for the educating and upliftment of child widows, in 1920
 HH Ayilyam Thirunal, Maharaja of Travancore
 HH Visakham Thirunal, Maharaja of Travancore
 Sir Vicar-ul-Umra, for distinguished service in the advancement of the interests of the British Raj
 Bharat Ratna Sir Mokshagundam Visveswaraiah, KCIE, Indian engineer, scholar, statesman and the Diwan of Mysore 
 Charlotte Viall Wiser, co-author of Behind Mud Walls, nutritionist, and Presbyterian missionary
 Mona Chandravati Gupta, Myanmar-born Indian social worker, educationist and the founder of Nari Sewa Samiti, a non governmental organization working for the social and economic upliftment of women
 Silverine Swer, Khasi environmental and social activist
 Khan Bahadur Abu Nasr Muhammad Yahia, Zamindar and Honorary Magistrate of Sylhet, for public services in British India

See also
 British and Commonwealth orders and decorations

References

External links

Image of obverse side of Gold Kaisar-i-Hind Medal at medals.org.uk

Orders, decorations, and medals of British India
Awards established in 1900

Awards disestablished in 1947
Civil awards and decorations of India
Titles in India